Mischivirus is a genus of viruses in the order Picornavirales, in the family Picornaviridae. Bats serve as natural hosts. There are five species in this genus.

Taxonomy
The genus contains the following five species:
 Mischivirus A
 Mischivirus B
 Mischivirus C
 Mischivirus D
 Mischivirus E

Structure
Viruses in Mischivirus are non-enveloped, with icosahedral, spherical, and round geometries, and T=pseudo3 symmetry. The diameter is around 30 nm. Genomes are linear and non-segmented, around 8.5kb in length.

Life cycle
Viral replication is cytoplasmic. Entry into the host cell is achieved by attachment of the virus to host receptors, which mediates endocytosis. Replication follows the positive stranded RNA virus replication model. Positive stranded RNA virus transcription is the method of transcription. Translation takes place by ribosomal skipping. The virus exits the host cell by lysis, and viroporins. Bats serve as the natural host.

References

External links
 Viralzone: Mischivirus
 ICTV

Picornaviridae
Virus genera